Tron Lightcycle Power Run (also known as TRON Lightcycle / Run) is a semi-enclosed launched steel motorbike roller coaster attraction at Shanghai Disneyland and Magic Kingdom in Walt Disney World. Based on the Tron franchise, the attraction takes guests on a ride through the Grid on their own light cycle.

History
The Shanghai Disneyland ride debuted along with the rest of the park on June 16, 2016.

The Magic Kingdom version was first announced at the D23 Expo on July 15, 2017 as part of the unveiling of 23 improvements to Disney Parks, including 4 new rides across the theme parks. The ride's construction began in February 2018 with land clearing. It was originally scheduled to open for the Walt Disney World's 50th anniversary in fall 2021, but due to the outbreak of the COVID-19 pandemic, the opening date had to be postponed. On September 11, 2022, it was announced at the D23 Expo that the TRON Lightcycle / Run attraction was scheduled to be opened by spring 2023, as part of the "Disney 100 Years of Wonder" celebration. On January 10, 2023, it was announced that the Magic Kingdom coaster would open on April 4, 2023. The ride had previews from February 6 to March 3, 2023, exclusively for Walt Disney World employees.

Design
In Shanghai Disneyland, the attraction is located inside, underneath a color-shifting canopy in Tomorrowland. The Magic Kingdom attraction was placed in a section of Tomorrowland to the north of Space Mountain. The Magic Kingdom version's official name was revealed as TRON Lightcycle / Run.

The coaster's track takes riders inside and outside the attraction's building, reaching speeds of nearly —the fastest for any Disney roller coaster.

The attraction's motorbike-styled vehicles were created by Walt Disney Imagineering as a method of specializing individual rider experience. The ride was then given a Tron-theme because the ride vehicles resembled the lightcycles featured in the Tron franchise. When aboard the ride vehicle, riders lean forward and grip a set of handlebars. A pad situated behind the seat secures the rider in place.

Rankings

References

External links

Magic Kingdom - Official website

2016 establishments in China
2023 establishments in Florida 
Amusement rides based on film franchises
Magic Kingdom
Roller coasters in China
Roller coasters in Florida
Roller coasters introduced in 2016
Roller coasters introduced in 2023
Shanghai Disneyland
Tron (franchise)
Walt Disney Parks and Resorts attractions